Love with an Accent is a 2012 Russian comedy film directed by Rezo Gigineishvili.

Plot 
The film tells beautiful love stories against the backdrop of southern nature.

Cast 
 Anna Mikhalkova
 Nadezhda Mikhalkova
 Merab Ninidze
 Sofiya Nizharadze
 Onise Oniani

References

External links 
 

2012 films
2010s Russian-language films
2012 romantic comedy films
Films shot in Georgia (country)
Russian romantic comedy films
Russian anthology films